Nathan of Gaza (1643–1680) or Nathan Benjamin ben Elisha Hayyim haLevi Ashkenazi or Ghazzati) was a theologian and author born in Jerusalem. After his marriage in 1663 he moved to Gaza, where he became famous as a prophet for the Jewish messiah claimant Sabbatai Zevi.

Biography

Nathan of Gaza was born in Jerusalem around 1643-1644; he died on Friday, January 11, 1680 in Macedonia. Although he grew up in Jerusalem, his parents were not born in Ottoman Syria. On the contrary, they had emigrated from Poland or Germany.

His father, Elisha Hayyim ben Jacob, was a distinguished rabbinic intellectual who served as an envoy of Jerusalem collecting donations for impoverished Jews. During his travels he would distribute kabbalistic works which he had obtained in Jerusalem. Upon settling in Ottoman Palestine, Elisha Hayyim ben Jacob took on the surname "Ashkenazi" as a means of differentiating his family and himself from the largely Sephardic inhabitants of the Ottoman province. He died in Morocco in 1673.

Prior to his father's death, Nathan of Gaza began studying Talmud and Kabbalah under Jacob Hagiz. The relationship between these two would continue for many years. In fact, Nathan of Gaza would spend a majority of his life – up until about 1664 – with his teacher at a rabbinic college. During this academic period, documents were written that described his interest in and persistence towards academic work. It is said that he was "…an extremely gifted student, of quick apprehension and a brilliant intellect. His talents…[were] noteworthy for their rare combination of intellectual power and capacity for profound thinking with imagination and strong emotional sensitivity…" At the age of nineteen or twenty, he married the daughter of an affluent Jew named Samuel Lissabona. The nuptials were believed to have taken place before the end of the year 1663, when he joined his wife's family in Gaza. There, he was able to focus considerably on his religious studies.

It is upon moving to the area of Gaza that Nathan of Gaza began to take up a more in-depth study of Kabbalah. Only upon delving into the mysterious realm of Jewish mysticism did he begin to embark on mystical experiences. An example of such a transformative incident can be seen with his prophetic awakening, which he describes in a letter written in 1673:

This vision lasted approximately twenty-four hours and was said to have had a powerful impact on his overall perception of reality as well as his entire self. While the revelation was overpowering and transformative, it was the only visual moment where Nathan of Gaza felt that he was a true prophet. Nevertheless, in addition to his physical and mental alteration, there was another important component to the vision: Nathan of Gaza believed that a man by the name of Sabbatai Zevi was the messiah. This strong belief in Sabbatai Zevi as the next leader of the Jewish people marked the initiation of the first Sabbatean believer, Nathan of Gaza. It also constituted the beginning of the Sabbatean movement itself.

Nathan of Gaza's prophecy about Sabbatai Zevi was not his only mental visualization. On the contrary, as the years passed, he would have many other visions, all of which would aid his movement and promote the belief in Sabbatai Zevi. His second vision came on the evening of the Shavuot festival in the spring of 1665. Nathan of Gaza was said to have undergone a spiritual possession by a maggid, or a divine spirit. At the moment of this spiritual takeover, he was described as dancing wildly and emitting a special kind of odor. This smell is described in the Zohar and is believed to be associated with the scent of the Garden of Eden as well as of the prophet Elisha and Rabbi Isaac Luria.

While the vision itself is significantly different from that of the prophetic awakening, it does contain several similarities. One of the parallels is that of transformation. Like the prophetic awakening, as soon as the maggidic possession ended, Nathan of Gaza underwent a kind of alteration. Unlike the first vision, this change was not physical or mental. On the contrary, it was one that involved the perception of Nathan of Gaza by the Jewish community. He became viewed by others as a prophet and as a spiritual "doctor". The public's acknowledgement of Nathan of Gaza as a mystic and as a seer in particular allowed there to be later on an immediate acceptance of Sabbatai Zevi as the next messiah. In general, it is the use of prophecies that plays a central role in this particular movement. The numerous predictions made by Nathan of Gaza and Sabbatai Zevi himself caused a significant part of the contemporary Jewish community to become Sabbatean followers.

As previously mentioned, Nathan of Gaza envisioned Sabbatai Zevi as the next messiah for the Jewish people. However, Sabbatai Zevi's acceptance of this messianic role was not instantaneous. His first encounter with Nathan of Gaza was not about his position as the next Jewish savior, but rather as a patient to a doctor. At the time, Nathan of Gaza was becoming well known as a spiritual physician. Sabbatai Zevi visited him in hopes of curing him from an illness that he had contracted. (Gershom Scholem later believed that Sabbatai Zevi suffered from a psychological condition he identified as "manic-depressive psychosis", today normally called "bipolar disorder".) Instead of trying to aid him with his psychological sickness, Nathan of Gaza divulged to Sabbatai Zevi his prophetic vision. Initially, when "…Nathan addressed him as the messiah, 'he laughed at him and said, 'I had it [the messianic vocation], but have sent it away.' '"  It was only through intense discussion and much persuasion that he was able to sway Sabbatai Zevi into accepting his messianic mission. Then, in May 1665, Sabbatai Zevi made the decision that would place Nathan of Gaza and himself in the public sphere forever. He exposed himself to the world as the true savior.

In December 1665, Sabbatai Zevi and Nathan of Gaza parted ways. Sabbatai Zevi embarked on a journey to Turkey where he would begin to advocate his newfound position as the Jewish savior. They would not see each other again until after Sabbatai Zevi's later conversion to Islam. Thus, from the fall of 1665 until the summer of 1666, the two worked arduously on the next stage of their movement–convincing the world that Sabbatai Zevi was the messiah.

Seeing that the rabbis of Jerusalem were very hostile to the Sabbatean movement, Nathan proclaimed Gaza to be henceforth the holy city. He first spread about the Messiah's fame by sending circulars from Palestine to the most important communities in Europe. Then he visited several of the chief cities in Europe, Africa, and India, and finally returned to Palestine. Even after Sabbatai Zevi's apostasy Nathan did not desert his cause; but, thinking it unsafe to remain in Palestine any longer, he made preparations to go to Smyrna. The rabbis, seeing that the credulous were confirmed anew in their belief, excommunicated all the Sabbatians, and particularly Nathan (Dec 9, 1666), warning everybody against harboring or even approaching him. After a stay of a few months at Smyrna he went (end of April, 1667) to Adrianople, where, in spite of his written promise that he would remain quiet, he continued his agitation. He urged the Sabbatians of Adrianople to proclaim their adhesion to the cause by abolishing the fasts of the 17th of Tammuz and the 9th of Ab.

Travels through Europe

Again excommunicated at Adrianople, he went with a few followers to Thessaloniki. There he met with scant welcome, but had more success in the communities of Chios and Corfu. From Corfu he went to Venice (March, 1668), where the rabbinate and the council of the city compelled him to give them a written confession that all his prophecies were the production of his imagination. The confession was published, whereupon Abraham ha-Yakini, the originator of the Sabbatian movement, wrote Nathan a letter in which he sympathized with him over his persecution and expressed his indignation at the acts of the Venetian rabbinate.

The Venetian Jews then induced Nathan to set out for Livorno, where the Jewish population was known to be inimical to him. They sent an escort with him, ostensibly as a mark of honor, but in reality to prevent him from going elsewhere. He divined their motives in sending him to Livorno, however, and, succeeding in eluding his escort, proceeded to Rome. In spite of his disguise he was recognized there, and was banished from the city. He then went to Livorno voluntarily, and even there made converts to his cause. From Livorno he returned to Adrianople, and seems to have spent the remainder of his days in travel.

Works

One of the ways in which Nathan of Gaza was able to persuade the Jewish community about Sabbatai Zevi and Sabbateanism was through his writings. He composed a variety of letters and other written documents that promoted an entirely new kind of theology, one that merged the current notions of Kabbalah (of the time) with elements of Lurianic mysticism, a subject that he studied when he was younger. In addition to creating a “new type” of mysticism, he also composed a document entitled Derush ha-Tanninim (“Treatise on Dragons”; published by Scholem in be-Iqvot Mashiah [Jerusalem, 1944]). This article stressed the notion of a “New Law” in which the old positive and negative commandments of the Torah were eliminated. This became the basis for what Gershom Scholem later referred to as “Sabbatean antinomianism.”

Not only did Nathan of Gaza publish documents that advocated for a change and a removal of the Jewish laws and commandments, but he also composed a variety of other texts that discussed concepts entirely different from these unorthodoxies. For example, he wrote Hadrat Kodesh (Constantinople, 1735), a Kabbalistic commentary on the Book of Genesis, particularly on the aspect of creation. Several years later, Nathan of Gaza published Ozar Nehmad (Venice, 1738), a supplement to the Hadrat Kodesh. In addition to these contributions, he was mistakenly believed to be the author of the Hemdat Yamim, a guidebook for the performance of ritual practices as well as prayers. As evident from these alternative spiritual manuscripts, Nathan of Gaza was not solely a devout Sabbatean follower and believer; he was one who strived to provide an alternative perspective and understanding to the Jewish faith.

He also wrote Peri 'EtzHadar, prayers for the 15th of Shebat (ib. 1753), and Tiqqun Qeri'ah, an ascetic work according to Sabbatian doctrines (Amsterdam, 1666). His account of his travels was translated into German by Moritz Horschetzky and published in Orient, Lit. ix. 170-172, 299-301.

Overall, the documents that Nathan of Gaza produced and presented were both positively and negatively received by the Jewish community. Some of the rabbis in Jerusalem, for example, were divided over the ideas that Nathan of Gaza wrote. A number of them felt that these written records were sacrilegious; they defied the basic tenets of the Jewish faith. Nevertheless, the composition of these texts provided for a further platform in which Sabbatai Zevi and Nathan of Gaza could promote their Sabbatean ideologies.

Death
On Friday, January 11, 1680 in Üsküp, Ottoman Empire (now Skopje, Republic of North Macedonia), Nathan of Gaza died. According to another version he died in Sofia, Ottoman Empire (now Sofia, Republic of Bulgaria) but his body was transferred to Üsküp and buried here. It is presumed also, he could have died traveling from Sofia to Üsküp. It is understood that upon arriving into Üsküp that day, he immediately requested that several gravediggers construct his grave. He told these men that he was about to expire and wanted to be prepared so that in the instance of his death, his burial could occur prior to the start of the Sabbath. Then, as he predicted, “‘[w]hile he was still in [a] rabbi’s house he fell down and died, and the members of the congregation buried him with great honor.’” While the death of the prophet was a tragic event for his followers, his burial place was a pilgrimage site after his death, but it would not become a permanent pilgrimage site, since it survived only until World War II, when it was destroyed.

References

Further reading
 Goldish, Matt. The Sabbatean Prophets. Cambridge, Massachusetts: Harvard University Press, 2004.
 Scholem, Gershom. Sabbatai Sevi: The Mystical Messiah. Princeton, New Jersey: Princeton University Press, 1973.
 Cengiz Sisman, "The Burden of Silence: Sabbatai Sevi and the Evolution of the Ottoman-Turkish Donmes", New York: Oxford University Press, 2015.

1643 births
1680 deaths
17th-century apocalypticists
Angelic visionaries
Ashkenazi Jews in Ottoman Palestine
Jewish mysticism
People from Gaza City
People from Jerusalem
Sabbateans
Prophets